The People's Party of Catalonia (PP or PPC) is a conservative, Christian-democratic political party in Catalonia. It is the Catalan affiliate of the Spanish People's Party and holds strongly unionist positions.

Electoral performance

Parliament of Catalonia

Cortes Generales

European Parliament

References

External links
 

Conservative parties in Spain
Political parties in Catalonia
Catalonia